Sondre Kåfjord (born 7 June 1948) was president of the Football Association of Norway (NFF) from 2004 to 2010. He was replaced by Yngve Hallén. Kåfjord is educated as siviløkonom in Bergen, and he has been rector at Molde University College. He worked in Sparebanken Møre before he was president of NFF.

References

Football people in Norway
Living people
1948 births
Norwegian sports executives and administrators